The Karabisianoi, sometimes anglicized as the Carabisians, were the main forces of the Byzantine navy from the mid-7th century until the early 8th century. The name derives from the Greek karabos or karabis (Greek: κάραβος, καραβίς) for "ship" (cf. caravel), and literally means "people of the ships, sea-men". The Karabisianoi were the first new  permanent naval establishment of the Byzantine Empire, formed to confront the Muslim expansion at sea. They were disbanded and replaced with a series of maritime themes some time in 718–730.

History and role
The Karabisianoi were established sometime in the second half of the 7th century in response to the Muslim conquests. Various scholars have suggested that it evolved from the remainders of the old quaestura exercitus or the late Roman field army of the Illyricum, but these suggestions remain hypothetical. The date of the fleet's establishment is unclear: some scholars propose that it was established in the 650s or 660s by Emperor Constans II, following the major naval defeat at the Battle of the Masts in 655, while others think that it was created after the Siege of Constantinople (674–678), where the Arab advance by sea seems to have been almost unopposed.

The Karabisianoi are widely held to have been the first permanently maintained naval force of the Byzantine Empire. Before that, as the Mediterranean was a "Roman lake", only a limited number of relatively small warships were maintained in the main harbours and along the fluvial borders of the Empire for patrols and transport tasks. Larger Byzantine fleets were assembled only on an ad hoc basis for specific expeditions. The Karabisianoi were formed in largely the same way as the land army's themes: they were a distinct military corps named after its soldiers, and headed by a stratēgos (stratēgos tōn karabōn/tōn plōimatōn). Although they are often referred to as the "Carabisian Theme", this designation is erroneous as the Karabisianoi remained a purely military command and do not appear to have constituted a specific territorial division like the land themes. The stratēgos''' base is not known, with suggestions ranging from Rhodes to Keos and Samos. The Karabisianoi have also been variously seen as an essentially provincial fleet, tasked with defending the southern coast of Asia Minor from Miletus to Seleucia in Cilicia, the Aegean islands and the imperial holdings in southern Greece, and serving alongside a central imperial fleet in Constantinople, or a command encompassing virtually the entire effective force of the Byzantine navy, and active in both defensive and offensive capacities from the Black Sea to the Exarchate of Africa.

The Karabisianoi were greatly strengthened under Emperor Justinian II, who settled several thousand Mardaites to serve as rowers and marines along the southern coasts of Asia Minor. Justinian also created a separate theme and fleet for southern Greece, named "Hellas". The Karabisianoi played a major role in the failed expedition to recover Carthage in 697–698, and led the revolt that installed the admiral Apsimar (Tiberios III) on the throne. The last mention of the stratēgos of the Karabisianoi is in 710/711, and it is not until 732 that his chief successor, the stratēgos of the Cibyrrhaeot Theme, is mentioned. This has led to two different suggestions as to the date and reason of the disbandment of the Karabisianoi.

The Karabisianoi were replaced chiefly by the new Cibyrrhaeot Theme, the first naval theme (thema nautikon), which was a formerly subordinate command under a droungarios and covered the southern coast of Asia Minor. In other coastal provinces, various smaller fleets and squadrons under droungarioi'' and other officers were tasked with local defence.

References

Sources

Further reading

7th-century establishments in the Byzantine Empire
8th-century disestablishments in the Byzantine Empire
Byzantine navy
Arab–Byzantine wars
Medieval Aegean Sea
Military units and formations of the Byzantine Empire